S. R. Ramaiah (died 18 June 2021), popularly known as Sooram Ramaiah, was an Indian freedom fighter, a Gandhian and a senior Indian National Congress politician.
He was born in Sulibele. Later he became President of Sulibele Gram Panchayat before being elected as a President of Hosakote Taluk board. He was elected to Mysore Legislative Assembly from Hosakote Devanahalli seat in 1957 Mysore Assembly elections.

References 

Politicians from Mysore
Indian National Congress politicians from Karnataka
Mysore MLAs 1957–1962
People from Bangalore Rural district
Kannada people
Members of the Mysore Legislature
1910s births
2021 deaths
Year of birth uncertain
Indian centenarians
Men centenarians